Fanuza Fahimovna Kadirova (born 6 April 1998) is a Russian ice hockey player and member of the Russian national team, currently playing with Dinamo-Neva Saint Petersburg of the Zhenskaya Hockey League (ZhHL).

She has represented Russia at five IIHF Women's World Championships (2015, 2016, 2017, 2019, 2021) and at two Universiades, winning gold in both 2017 and 2019. At the 2018 Winter Olympics, she participated in the women’s ice hockey tournament with the Olympic Athletes from Russia team.

References

External links

1998 births
Living people
Sportspeople from Tatarstan
Russian women's ice hockey forwards
Ice hockey players at the 2018 Winter Olympics
Ice hockey players at the 2022 Winter Olympics
Olympic ice hockey players of Russia
Universiade gold medalists for Russia
Universiade medalists in ice hockey
Competitors at the 2017 Winter Universiade
Competitors at the 2019 Winter Universiade